Meemanage Mary Magdalene Leticia Peiris (born 18 October 1934 – died 31 October 2013 as ලැටීෂියා පීරිස්‌) [Sinhala]), popularly as Leticia Peiris, was an actress in Sri Lankan cinema, theater and television. One of the earliest pillars in Sri Lankan film history, Peiris had a career that spanned more than five decades. She is the last acting link of the Jayamanne lineage.

She died on 31 October 2013 with Alzheimer's disease at the age of 80.

Personal life
Peiris was born on 18 October 1934 in Pallansena village, Kochchikade area in Colombo. She completed education from Negambo Dalupotha Vidyalaya and  Harischandra National College, Negambo. Her elder sister Grace Peiris was married to popular actor B. A. W. Jayamanne. Grace met Jayamanne during a film shoot.

Leticia was married to K. Micheal de Silva and wedding was celebrated in December 1957 at the age of 24. The couple has two daughters: Chandani and Renukaa.

Career
Peries started her film career with her sister and brother-in-law B.A.W. Jayamanne. She played the role of "Hilda" in the stage play Kadawunu Poronduwa at the age of 7. She was one of the earliest child actresses in Sri Lankan drama history. She continued to act as "Hilda" for a record 800 times in 10 consecutive years. But she missed out on her chance to become the first child actress of Sinhala cinema by starring in the first Sinhala film Kadawunu Poronduwa due to heavy fever. Since then she has been a member of the Jayamanne's Minerva Drama Team. She acted in stage plays Gehenu Sitha and Gedara Hatana produced by W.M. Perera.

Her maiden cinematic appearance came through 1948 film Weradunu Kurumanama directed by Jothish Singh. She then acted in 1960 film Hadisi Vinischaya and portrayed the comic support of Eddie Jayamanne in the film. She also had the privilege of becoming a singer as she sang the song "Adara Swami Kema Kannako" accompany with Eddie Jayamanne. She is also the singer who sang with Eddie Jayamanne, the second opposition Virindu song in a Sinhala film. She then portrayed the comic character Bertram Fernando in the movie Segawunu Pilithura. After the 1952 film Umathu Wishwasaya, Peiris starred in the 1957 film Siriyalatha produced by Eddie Jayamanne and produced by Rukmani Devi and directed by Indian filmmaker S. S. Rajan. She continued act in many popular films of the early era including, Seeye Nottuwa, Kathuru Muwath, Bicycle Hora, Duleeka, Ihatha Athmaya, Wathura Karththaya and Wasanthaye Dawasak. She performed excellently in the 1957 film Siriyalatha opposite to Rukmani Devi. In 1988, Peiris received the "Namaskara Pooja' Upahara Pranama Award" at the Sarasaviya Awards.

After the marriage, she quit from the acting and continued to support his husband and children. After her children returning to adulthood, she returned to the stage drama and starred in the play Kadawuna Poronduwa directed by Mark Samaranayake. She returned to cinema at the invitation of K.A.W. Perera in 1970 with the film Kathuru Muwath. Since then, Peiris played a comic or horror character in every film made by K.A.W. Perera. She is also a popular radio singer in Sri Lanka Broadcasting Corporation (SLBC).

She is also the only member of the Jayamanne family who was fortunate enough to join the television screen. One of her popular television acting came through comedy sitcom Nonavaruni Mahathvaruni with the role "Premachandra's mother". Some of her popular serials include, Asalwasiyo, Pramada Wadi, Gedara Bala, Hangi Hora and Hingana Kolla. Her final television serial was Wadadiya. While performing there, she was diagnosed with Alzheimer's disease.

Death
Since 2008, she had had memory impairment. She had been in bed for two months and had not been cured despite her treatment of bed wounds. She also had diabetes. She was seriously ill in final years. But none of the artists called to help her or visit her. She died on 31 October 2013 from Alzheimer's disease. Funeral took place at Raddolugama Christian Cemetery without the participation of artists on 2 November 2013 at 3 pm.

Filmography

References

External links
 අගැයුමක් නැති මිනිස්සු
 සැඟවුණු පිළිතුරෙන් පණ ලැබුණු ‘කුසුමලතා’
 Laticia Peiris films

2013 deaths
Sri Lankan film actresses
Sinhalese actresses
1934 births
Sri Lankan stage actresses
Sri Lankan television actresses